The Feldjägerkorps was a military police organization in the German Wehrmacht during World War II. It was formed on 27 November 1943 from distinguished veterans and Patrol Service personnel. This corps was formed into three Feldjäger Commands (I, II and III), which reported directly to Field Marshal Keitel, and was senior to all other military police organizations.

This was divided into 30 (Streifen) Patrols, which were based 12 miles behind the front lines. These patrols could be rough in their justice, which included Drumhead court-martials. They were supported by a Streifkorps (Patrol Corps), organized into sections of a senior non-commissioned officer and 9 enlisted personnel.

History
By 1943, World War II was turning against Germany and morale amongst the front line troops was dropping. Until this time, the Feldgendarmerie and Geheime Feldpolizei had been relied upon to try to curb desertion and maintain discipline; however, the recent string of German defeats and the fact that there was no single service dedicated solely to catching deserters impelled the creation of the Feldjägerkorps in November of that year. In order to be eligible for service, soldiers had to have a minimum three years of frontline combat experience and have earned the Iron Cross 2nd class.

Organization
The Feldjägerkorps consisted of 3 Feldjägerkommando:

 Feldjägerkommando I was formed in Königsberg. It was commanded by General der Flieger Ernst Müller.
 Feldjägerkommando II was formed in Breslau. Its commanders were General der Panzertruppe Werner Kempf, General der Infantrie Karl von Oven and General der Artillerie Willi Moser.
 Feldjägerkommando III was formed in Vienna. It commanders were General der Infantrie Hans-Karl von Scheele, General der Infantrie Martin Grase and General der Flieger Wilhelm Speidel.

Feldjägerkommando I and II saw action on the Eastern front, whilst Feldjägerkommando III saw action on the western front.

Each Feldjägerkommandeur originally controlled a Feldjägerabteilung (battalion), and from 24 April 1944, a regiment). The Fj battalion consisted of five motorized companies, each of 30 officers and 90 non-commissioned officers. The Feldjägerregiment contained five Feldjägerabteilungen each of which contained three Kompanies, of about 50 men.

The basic unit was the Streife (patrol) which was made up of anywhere between 1 Feldjäger and 3 Feldjäger and an officer.

Every Abteilung had command over a "Fliegendes Standgericht" (flying drumhead trial/flying court martial), which composed of three judges. The leadership of a regiment consist of a "Chefrichter" (chief justice) next to the Kommandeur (commander). The Feldjägerregiment could shelter every unit of military or civil police or Ordnungstruppen (regulation troops), for example the Feldjägerregiment III had from March to April 1945 authority about the "Auffangorganisation der Luftwaffe" at the western front.

Mission

The authority of the Feldjägerkorps came directly from the German Army High Command, and as such even the lowest ranking soldier theoretically carried more power than army officers. The commanding officer of a Feldjägerkommando had the same level of authority as an Army commander with the authority to punish any soldier of any branch of service (the Waffen SS included).

The Feldjägerkorps operated parallel to the front line and approximately 12–15 miles behind it. Their basic duties were to:

 maintain order and discipline
 prevent panic retreats
 gather stragglers and assemble them at collection points, where they could be assembled into ad hoc units
 check soldiers travel and/or leave permits at embarkation points
 round up deserters and either return to their units, hand them over to the Feldgendarmerie or Geheime Feld Polizei or issue punishment themselves.
 Gather Prisoners of War (PoWs) and hand them over to the appropriate authorities.

They could also be employed in the same capacity as the Feldgendarmerie.

After the surrender of Germany, Feldjägerkommando remained armed and at the disposal of the US Army in order to maintain discipline amongst the German PoWs. Feldjägerkommando  finally and formally surrendered its arms to the Allies on 23 June 1946.

Uniform
The Feldjäger wore a regular German Army infantryman's uniform with white Waffenfarbe. The only items identifying him were the gorget and the red armband worn on the lower left cuff, bearing the bold black lettering:

Other Feldjäger units
The SA-Feldjägerkorps - In October 1933 Hermann Göring established a supplementary police group for use within the State of Prussia.  This group was also intended to have responsibilities in selected cities within Greater Germany. The unit consisted of former polizei members and volunteers recruited from existing Sturmabteilung (SA) and Schutzstaffel (SS) units. At this point in their history, leaders of the Nazi Party intended to use police brigades for protection as well as for gaining power over other political groups.  Much of the intent of organizing these police units was to band together groups of men who had military training and knowledge stemming from their First World War experience. Designated the SA Field Police (SA-Feldjägerkorps), this formation was organized into eight battalions of approximately 195 men each with each battalion being assigned to a specific city or district with its headquarters in Berlin.  Members of the SA-Feldjägerkorps were allowed to rejoin or transfer into the SS following completion of their service with the unit.  On 1 April 1935 the SA-Feldjägerkorps was incorporated into the larger Prussian “Schutzpolizei” and was no longer under the control of the SA or related authorities. Over time, many smaller police units were organized or cluster together for the purpose of expanding control.

See also
 Feldgendarmerie

Bibliography

References

External links
 GERMAN MILITARY POLICE 

Military history of Germany during World War II
Military provosts of Germany
Wehrmacht
Police forces of Nazi Germany
Defunct military provosts